The 1st Colorado Infantry Regiment (officially the 1st Regiment of Colorado Volunteers) was a volunteer  infantry regiment of the United States Army formed in the Colorado Territory in 1861 and active in the American West in the late 19th century.

History
The regiment was formed shortly after the outbreak of the American Civil War by order of William Gilpin, the first governor of the territory. Recruiters began enlisting men in August 1861, just six months after the organization of the territory. Known as "Gilpin's Pet Lambs" for the involvement of the governor in its formation, the regiment served in the Western Theater, at first serving in various detachments throughout the territory.

The regiment's most notable service came in the New Mexico Campaign in the spring of 1862, in which they helped repulse the advance of the Army of New Mexico under Henry Hopkins Sibley at the battles of Glorieta Pass and Peralta.

In November 1862, the unit was reorganized along with Companies C and D of the 2nd Colorado Infantry into the 1st Colorado Cavalry. (This was done since the US War Department believed cavalry would be better in protecting the Western trails and for fighting the various Indian tribes.)

The first colonel of the regiment was John P. Slough, replaced in April 1862 by Major John Chivington, later chastised for his role as commander of the 3rd Colorado Cavalry in the November 1864 Sand Creek Massacre.

There is an active group of reenactors who portray the First Colorado (Company D) in Denver.

See also
List of Colorado Territory Civil War units
 157th Field Artillery Regiment (United States)

References

External links
 Colorado.gov website on the regiment

Units and formations of the Union Army from Colorado
Military units and formations in Colorado
1861 establishments in Colorado Territory
Military units and formations established in 1861
Military units and formations disestablished in 1862